Mimine is a Canadian short drama film, directed by Simon Laganière and released in 2021. The film stars Stéphane Breton as Bonus, a divorced father whose son Mimine (Laurent Lemaire) is visiting for the day, who is trying to impress the boy with a special, magical experience out of fear that he will be replaced in Mimine's heart by his mother's new boyfriend.

The film won the award for Best Regional Film at the 2023 Festival Plein(s) Écran(s), and was a Canadian Screen Award nominee for Best Live Action Short Drama at the 11th Canadian Screen Awards.

References

External links

2021 films
2021 short films
2021 drama films
Canadian drama short films
2020s French-language films
2020s Canadian films
French-language Canadian films
Films shot in Quebec
Films about father–son relationships